Hellier may refer to:

People
 Hellier de Carteret (fl. 1563–1578), Seigneur of Sark
 Cyril and Libbye Hellier (born 1952), identical twins and American operatic sopranos
 Kirsten Hellier (born 1969), New Zealand javelin thrower
 Trudy Hellier, Australian actress, director and screenwriter

Other uses
 Hellier, Kentucky, an unincorporated community in Pike County
Hellier (Documentary Series), a documentary series about mysterious synchronicities in Hellier, Kentucky
 Hellier Stradivarius, a c. 1679 violin made by Antonio Stradivari

See also
 Heller (disambiguation)
 Helliar (disambiguation)